Strange Boutique was a band from Washington, D.C. They were active between the years of 1987 and 1994 and released 4 full-length albums and 2 live albums on the Bedazzled Records label. They are also featured on several compilation albums. Monica Richards, the lead singer of Strange Boutique, later went on to form the underground band, Faith and the Muse.

On Saturday, July 3, 2004, Strange Boutique celebrated a brief reunion in Washington, D.C.  The band played at The Black Cat with This Ascension and Siddal.

Members
Monica Richards
Fred "Freak" Smith
Steve Willett
Rand Blackwell
Danny Ingram

Discography
The Loved One (1991)
Charm (1993)
The Kindest Worlds (1994)
The Collection: 1988-1994 (2004)

External links
 Official Strange Boutique website

American gothic rock groups
American shoegaze musical groups
Metropolis Records artists